Ajuterique is a municipality in the Honduran department of Comayagua

External links
 LINEAMIENTOS DE ORDENAMIENTO TERRITORIAL PARA EL MUNICIPIO DE AJUTERIQUE - SECRETARÍA DE GOBERNACIÓN Y JUSTICIA

References

Municipalities of the Comayagua Department